Peter Lomong (born July 6, 1996, in Kimotong, Budi County, Kapoeta State, South Sudan) is a South Sudanese-American runner who competed for Northern Arizona University in Flagstaff, Arizona, US. His elder brother Lopez Lomong also competed for Northern Arizona University.

Early life
Peter Lomong was born on July 6, 1996, to Rita Namana and Longoyathiya Lomongom. He belongs to the Buya tribe of southeastern South Sudan. After emigrating to the United States from a refugee camp in Kenya, Lomong attended Fork Union Military Academy in Virginia.

Lomong's younger brother, Alex Lomong, ran for Ohio State University.

References

 
 http://www.nauathletics.com/roster.aspx?rp_id=1932
 https://www.nauathletics.com/roster.aspx?rp_id=3371

External links
 

1985 births
Living people
American male middle-distance runners
South Sudanese male middle-distance runners
South Sudanese emigrants to the United States
South Sudanese Roman Catholics
Lost Boys of Sudan
Northern Arizona Lumberjacks men's track and field athletes